Vera Coking is a retired homeowner whose Atlantic City, New Jersey, boarding house was the focus of an eminent domain case involving Donald Trump.

History

In 1961, Coking and her husband bought the property at 127 South Columbia Place as a summertime retreat for $20,000. 

In the 1970s, Penthouse magazine publisher Bob Guccione offered Coking $1 million ($3.5 million in 2018) for her property in order to build the Penthouse Boardwalk Hotel and Casino. She declined the offer, and Guccione started construction of the hotel-casino in 1978 around the Coking house, but ran out of money in 1980 and construction stopped.  The steel framework structure was finally torn down in 1993. 

In 1993, Donald Trump bought several lots around his Atlantic City casino and hotel, intending to build a parking lot designed for limousines. Coking, who had lived in her house at that time for 32 years, refused to sell. As a result, the city condemned her house, using the power of eminent domain. She was offered $251,000, 
a quarter of what she was offered by Guccione 10 years earlier.

With the assistance of the Institute for Justice, Coking fought the local authorities and eventually prevailed. Superior Court Judge Richard Williams ruled that because there were "no limits" on what Trump could do with the property, the plan to take Coking's property did not meet the test of law. But Williams' ruling did not reject the practice of using eminent domain to take private property from one individual and transferring it to another, which was eventually upheld by the Supreme Court of the United States in Kelo v. City of New London.

Two other properties that prevailed against eminent domain eventually did sell: Sabatini's restaurant received $2.1 million and a pawnshop sold for $1.6 million. Their lots became part of a large lawn flanking a taxi stand for Trump's casino. Coking remained in her house until 2010, when she moved  to a retirement home in the San Francisco Bay Area near her daughter and grandchildren.

Property records show that on June 2, 2010, Coking transferred ownership of the house to her daughter, who put it on the market in 2011 with an initial asking price of $5 million. By September 2013 the price had been reduced to $1 million.

The property was finally sold for $583,000 in an auction on July 31, 2014. The buyer was Carl Icahn, who held the debt on Trump Entertainment, owner of Trump Plaza. He subsequently demolished the house on November 19, 2014. Neither the Casino Reinvestment Development Authority nor the owners of Trump Plaza expressed any interest in the auction.   

The adjacent Trump Plaza Hotel and Casino, the property for which Trump wanted Coking's property, to begin with, closed in September 2014, due to lack of business, and it was demolished on February 17, 2021.

See also

 Other real-estate holdouts:
 Edith Macefield, Seattle
 Figo House, Oregon
 Michael Forbes, Scotland
 Wu Ping, southwest China
Eminent domain
Kelo v. City of New London
 Up (2009 film)
 Holdout (architecture)

References

Housing in the United States
People from Atlantic City, New Jersey
Year of birth missing (living people)
Living people
Real estate holdout